Mohd Saufi Bin Muhammad (born 11 July 1992) is Malaysian footballer who plays as a goalkeeper for Kelantan in the Malaysia Premier League.

References

External links
 

1992 births
Living people
Kelantan FA players
Malaysian footballers
Association football goalkeepers